Simon Edward Osborn (born 19 January 1972) is an English former football player and football manager. A midfielder, he played 395 league and cup games in a 17-year career in the English Football League.

He began his career with Crystal Palace, helping the club to the First Division title in 1993–94, before he made a £90,000 move to Reading. He helped the "Royals" to a second-place finish in the First Division in 1994–95, though they were then beaten in the play-off final. He made a £1.1 million move to Queens Park Rangers in July 1995, before being sold on to Wolverhampton Wanderers for £1 million in December 1995. After six years and 185 appearances at Molineux, he was loaned out to Tranmere Rovers, before switching to Port Vale in September 2001. He moved on to Gillingham the following month, before he joined Walsall in July 2003.

He joined Hereford United in summer 2006, before moving into non-league football with Bromley. He helped the club to win promotion out of the Isthmian League in 2007, and briefly served the club as manager in 2008. He then joined Croydon Athletic, before scoring the winning goal for Cray Wanderers in the Isthmian League Division One South play-off final. In 2010, he became a player-coach at Erith & Belvedere. He joined the coaching staff at Margate in 2013, and was appointed joint-manager with Craig Holloway in April 2013, before losing his job eight months later.

Playing career

Crystal Palace
Osborn was educated at Ashburton High School, now known as Oasis Academy Shirley Park, Croydon, from 1983 to 1989. A central midfielder, Osborn started his career as a trainee at Crystal Palace in January 1990 under the stewardship of Steve Coppell. He turned professional for the 1989–90 season, when his performances for a newly promoted Palace side secured their First Division survival with a 15th-place finish and saw him voted Young Player of the Year by the club's fans. However he missed out on a place in the squad for the final of the FA Cup that season, which Palace lost to Manchester United in a replay. They went on to finish third in 1990–91, one of the best finishes in the club's history. They then dropped to tenth in 1991–92, enough to secure them a place as founder members of the Premier League. They were relegated in 20th place in 1992–93, though had they have won their final game of the season then Oldham Athletic would have taken their place in the relegation zone. Osborn scored in the League Cup semi-finals in 1993, Palace's consolation in a 5–1 aggregate defeat to Arsenal. New boss Alan Smith led the "Eagles" to the First Division title in 1993–94, Osborn's last season at Selhurst Park.

Reading
Reading manager Mark McGhee handed over £90,000 for his services at the start of the 1994–95 season on 17 August. The "Royals" narrowly missed out on a second successive promotion as Osborn formed a vital part of the team that finished second in the First Division. They went on to lose 4–3 to Bolton Wanderers in the play-off final at Wembley; the game was necessary due to the Premier League's reduction in size only allowing one automatic promotion place.

Queens Park Rangers
As a result of Reading's failure to secure promotion, Osborn decided to move away from Elm Park to gain Premier League experience, and got his wish when Queens Park Rangers manager Ray Wilkins splashed out £1.1 million for the midfielder in July 1995. Osborn lasted just six months at QPR, scoring once (against Bolton Wanderers) in nine Premier League games for a side who ended the season in the relegation places, before moving back down a division and signing for Mark McGhee's Wolverhampton Wanderers for a £1 million transfer fee.

Wolverhampton Wanderers
McGhee steered the club to a 20th-place finish in 1995–96, just three points above relegated Millwall. Osborn scored six goals in 39 games in 1996–97, as Wolves finished third, four points behind Barnsley in the automatic promotion places; they went on to lose to his former club Crystal Palace at the play-off semi-finals. They missed out on the play-offs by three places and nine points in 1997–98, Osborn scoring twice in 26 games, including one against former club QPR. That season Wolves also got to the FA Cup semi-final but Osborn missed the game against Arsenal due to suspension. Early in the 1998–99 season McGhee was sacked, and replaced by his assistant Colin Lee. Wolves finished seventh, one place and three points behind Bolton Wanderers in the play-offs; Osborn scored three goals in 42 appearances. The 1999–2000 season saw Bolton again finish sixth, one place and just two points ahead of Wolves; Osborn was limited to 26 appearances. Following a poor start to 2000–01, Colin Lee was replaced by Dave Jones in January 2001, and two months later Osborn was loaned out to league rivals Tranmere Rovers for three months, where he scored once against Fulham. At the end of the season his six-year stay at Molineux was brought to an end, after 185 appearances for the club.

Port Vale to Gillingham
In September 2001, he moved on a free transfer to Brian Horton's Port Vale in the Second Division. He played eight games in four weeks at Vale Park, before moving back up to the First Division with Gillingham. He scored three goals in 30 games for Andy Hessenthaler's "Gills" in 2001–02. He missed September to March of the 2002–03 campaign, and left the Priestfield Stadium after 49 league and cup appearances for the club.

Walsall
Osborn signed for Walsall in July 2003, who were then managed by his former boss Colin Lee. However Lee left the club in April 2004, and Osborn served as assistant to new manager Paul Merson for a short time. The "Saddlers" suffered relegation out of the First Division in 2003–04, with Osborn scoring three goals in 46 appearances. Ironically they finished behind his former club Gillingham, who avoided the drop, on goal difference. Osborn then played 41 games as Walsall finished 11th in League One in 2004–05. He picked up ten yellow cards and two goals in his 36 appearances in 2005–06, as Walsall finished last and suffered relegation into League Two; this was to prove to be his last season at the Bescot Stadium.

Later career
Osborn started the 2006–07 campaign with Hereford United, a club Graham Turner had led to promotion back to the Football League after nine years in the Conference. However he played just once for the "Bulls", and moved on to Bromley in September 2006. The "Ravens" finished the 2006–07 season as runners-up of the Isthmian League, and beat Billericay Town in the play-off final to win promotion into the Conference South. He was appointed player-manager of Bromley in January 2008, assisted by Bobby Bowry, but resigned three months later following a change in ownership, having led them to an eleventh-place finish in 2007–08. He both succeeded and was preceded by Mark Goldberg. Osborn then moved on to Croydon Athletic of the Isthmian League Division One South.

He signed for league rivals Cray Wanderers in February 2009, appearing on the bench against Ashford Town and making his debut for the club in March against Walton & Hersham. He scored the only goal for Wanderers in their 1–0 victory in the play-off final against Metropolitan Police. He left the club at the end of the season and retired from playing football, opting to look for a coaching role elsewhere. However he then came out of retirement in March 2010 to re-sign for Cray Wanderers. For the second successive season Osborn scored in the final game of the season, against Horsham. He then was appointed as player-coach at Erith & Belvedere of the Kent League.

Managerial career
Osborn joined the coaching staff at Margate in January 2013, as assistant to caretaker manager Craig Holloway. He was appointed joint-manager with Craig Holloway in April 2013. He became sole manager in November 2013, but was sacked a month later.

Career statistics

Honours
Crystal Palace
Football League First Division: 1993–94

Reading
Football League First Division second-place promotion: 1994–95

Bromley
Isthmian League play-offs: 2006–07

Cray Wanderers
Isthmian League Division One South play-offs: 2009

References

1972 births
Living people
Footballers from Croydon
English footballers
Association football midfielders
Crystal Palace F.C. players
Reading F.C. players
Queens Park Rangers F.C. players
Wolverhampton Wanderers F.C. players
Tranmere Rovers F.C. players
Port Vale F.C. players
Gillingham F.C. players
Walsall F.C. players
Hereford United F.C. players
Bromley F.C. players
Croydon Athletic F.C. players
Cray Wanderers F.C. players
Erith & Belvedere F.C. players
Premier League players
English Football League players
National League (English football) players
Isthmian League players
Association football coaches
Association football player-managers
English football managers
Bromley F.C. managers
Margate F.C. managers
National League (English football) managers
Isthmian League managers